The Good-Natur'd Man is a play written by Oliver Goldsmith in 1768. The play was written in the form of a comedy and premiered at the Covent Garden Theatre in 1768, with Mary Bulkley as Miss Richland. It was a middling success for Goldsmith, and the printed version of the play became popular with the reading public. It was released at the same time as Hugh Kelly's False Delicacy, staged at Drury Lane Theatre. The two plays went head to head, with Kelly's proving the more popular.

Garrick rejected The Good-Natur'd Man, possibly because the story is an antidote of False Delicasy.

References

Bibliography
 Sherburne, George and Bond, Donald F. A Literary History of England, Volume III: The Restoration and Eighteenth Century. Routledge and Kegan Paul, 1967.
 Thomson, Peter. The Cambridge Introduction to English Theatre, 1660-1900. Cambridge University Press, 2006.

External links
 
  Script, with remarks by Elizabeth Inchbald. Printed some years after 1768.

1768 plays
British plays
Irish plays
Works by Oliver Goldsmith
Comedy plays